Eagle Keys (December 4, 1923 – December 20, 2012) was a Canadian football player and coach.  He is currently fifth all-time in regular season wins with 131 as a head coach in the Canadian Football League. He was inducted into the Canadian Football Hall of Fame in 1990.

Early life
Keys was an outstanding center and linebacker for the Western Kentucky Hilltoppers football team in 1942 and, after a stint in the military (Marine Corps) in World War II, 1946 and '47. He also lettered in baseball (pitcher-outfielder) three straight years (1946–48) after the War. He was an All-KIAC (Kentucky Intercollegiate Athletic Conference) selection in football as a senior. His 1946 baseball team went a perfect 9–0, outscoring the opponents by an average of five runs a game.

Eagle "Buddy" Keys was inducted into the Western Kentucky University Athletic Hall of Fame (Football-Baseball '42, '46–48) in 1994.

Professional career
Following his career on the Hill, Keys moved north to play professional football in the Canadian Football League. He was All-Eastern Conference for three straight years (1949–51) with the Montreal Alouettes and then he earned a berth on the All-Western Conference team throughout the next three seasons while playing for the Edmonton Eskimos. He is best remembered as a player for his final game when he played on a broken leg in the Eskimos' 1954 Grey Cup triumph.

Coaching career
After his six years as a player, he put in six more years as an assistant coach in the CFL before being named head coach of the Eskimos in 1959. He coached Edmonton from 1959 until 1963, became an assistant coach with the Saskatchewan Roughriders in 1964 and was promoted to head coach in 1965. He was awarded the CFL Coach of the Year award in 1968. In 1970, the Roughriders finished with a mark of 14 wins and 2 losses, a CFL record that stood until 1989 when Edmonton went 16–2 (by that time, the CFL had expanded its regular season schedule to 18 games). Keys resigned at the end of that season and coached the British Columbia Lions from 1971 until partway through the 1975 season. In 1966, he won his only championship as a head coach, with his Roughriders team winning the 54th Grey Cup (which was also the team's first CFL championship in team history). As such, he was voted the All-Time All-Star Coach for the Saskatchewan Roughriders. In total, he spent 16 seasons as a head coach in the Canadian Football League.

CFL Coaching record

Canadian Football Hall of Fame
He retired from coaching after the 1975 season and was inducted into the Canadian Football Hall of Fame in 1990. His 131 wins as a coach in the CFL still stands as the fifth highest victory total for a head coach in the league. He was elected as a builder on April 28, 1990.

Personal life
Keys had retired and was living in Burnaby, British Columbia, until his death on December 20, 2012. He and his wife Joyce (née White), also deceased, had five children.

See also
List of Canadian Football League head coaches by wins

References

1923 births
2012 deaths
United States Marine Corps personnel of World War II
American players of Canadian football
BC Lions coaches
Canadian football offensive linemen
Canadian Football Hall of Fame inductees
Edmonton Elks coaches
Edmonton Elks players
Montreal Alouettes players
People from Tompkinsville, Kentucky
Players of American football from Kentucky
Saskatchewan Roughriders coaches
United States Marines
Western Kentucky Hilltoppers football players